Food Service Solutions, Inc is a software development company based out of Altoona, Pennsylvania that successfully designed and implemented biometrics into a lunchline.

Founded in 1989, FSS uses biometric scanning technology to provide services for educational and institutional foodservice providers. The company has established a position of market leadership  addressing two problems in school-based foodservice operations. The first is that school children eligible for free or reduce-fee lunches through government assistance programs often fail to participate because of the perceived social stigma associated with showing a special card or meal ticket in front of other students. The second is that in the foodservice POS industry, software has historically been proprietary, cumbersome for clients to self-administer, and difficult to integrate with other technologies.

FSS also has a webservice, www.myschoolaccount.com where parents can view what their child has been eating, what their lunch account balance is and also make payments with their credit card or checking/savings account.

References

Companies based in Blair County, Pennsylvania
American companies established in 1989
Software companies based in Pennsylvania
Privately held companies based in Pennsylvania
1989 establishments in Pennsylvania
Software companies established in 1989